Michael Anthony Butler (born April 4, 1954) is a former American football defensive end who played seven seasons for the Green Bay Packers in the National Football League (NFL). He also played two seasons for the Tampa Bay Bandits of the United States Football League (USFL).

1954 births
Living people
Players of American football from Washington, D.C.
American football defensive ends
Kansas Jayhawks football players
Green Bay Packers players
Tampa Bay Bandits players